Pleasant Corners is an unincorporated community located in Heidelberg Township in Lehigh County, Pennsylvania. Pleasant Corners is located at the intersection of state routes 100 and 309 between New Tripoli and Schnecksville. Pleasant Corners is part of the Lehigh Valley, which has a population of 861,899 and is the 68th most populous metropolitan area in the U.S. as of the 2020 census.

Jacob Holben erected a foundry in 1850 and the settlement was named Holbensville in his honor. In 1857, it was renamed Pleasant Corners.

References

1850 establishments in Pennsylvania
Unincorporated communities in Lehigh County, Pennsylvania
Unincorporated communities in Pennsylvania